Dardurus is a genus of Australian tangled nest spiders first described by V. T. Davies in 1976.

Species
 it contains six species:
Dardurus agrestis Davies, 1976 – Australia (Queensland)
Dardurus nemoralis Davies, 1976 – Australia (Queensland)
Dardurus saltuosus Davies, 1976 – Australia (New South Wales)
Dardurus silvaticus Davies, 1976 – Australia (Queensland)
Dardurus spinipes Davies, 1976 – Australia (Queensland)
Dardurus tamborinensis Davies, 1976 – Australia (Queensland)

References

External links

Amaurobiidae
Araneomorphae genera
Spiders of Australia
Taxa named by Valerie Todd Davies